The Kettering Ironstone Railway was an industrial  narrow gauge railway that served the ironstone quarries around Kettering.

History 

Ironstone was discovered to the north of Kettering in 1858 when the Midland Railway mainline was driven through the hills. In 1876 quarrying started just to the west of the railway, with short horse-worked tramways used to haul the ore to a fan of sidings beside the Midland. An ironworks was constructed beside the sidings, opening in 1878.

To feed the newly installed blast furnaces, the tramways were extended to new ore fields to the south and west. In 1879 a 3ft gauge steam locomotive arrived from Black, Hawthorn & Co to deal with the greater traffic. 

As the closer ironstone pits became worked out. the tramways expanded to reach new sources of ore. In 1890 a much larger Manning Wardle locomotive was acquired second-hand to work these longer lines. In all three of these "long boiler special" 0-6-0ST locomotives were acquired for the railway.

In 1913 quarrying started on land near the village of Thorpe Malsor, more than two miles from the ironworks. A new branch of the tramway was laid to reach these, requiring a substantial viaduct to cross the valley below the village. In 1926 a unique double Sentinel locomotive was purchased for the Thorpe Malsor branch, though it was not a great success.

A final new set of ore fields were opened at Bunker Hill in 1933, again served by a new tramway branch.

After the Second World War, there was a general decline in demand for iron. The Thorpe Malsor pits were abandoned and the branch removed in 1949. The ironworks were nationalised in 1951, and the Bunker Hill pits were immediately abandoned. This left only the pits around Rothwell village in operation, served by a long tramway branch. The whole system was purchased by Stewarts & Lloyds in late 1956. The furnaces shut down in 1959, but ore extraction continued to supply the much larger Corby ironworks. Trains continued to run until October 1962. The remaining tramways were lifted by early 1963.

Locomotives

References

See also

 British industrial narrow gauge railways

3 ft gauge railways in England
Industrial railways in England
Rail transport in Northamptonshire